Jules-Louis Breton (1 April 1872 – 2 August 1940) was an inventor and a French politician. He was a representative of the French Assembly, and the proponent of the Breton-Prétot machine, a device developed in France from November 1914, intended to cut a way through barbed wire on the battlefield. It was developed with an engineer named Prétot, but did not progress beyond the experimental stage.

Biography
Breton was born on 1 April 1872 in Courrières, Pas-de-Calais.  He was a Socialist with Anarchist tendencies, and as a Natalist, endeavoured to giving more freedom to women.

During World War I he was France's Undersecretary of State for Inventions for National Defense. and later founded and directed the National Research and Invention Ministry.
He was also Minister of Hygiene under President Millerand in 1920.

Breton was the founder and first director of the National Board of Scientific and Industrial Research and Inventions (ORNI: Office national des recherches scientifiques et industrielles et des Inventions), created on 29 December 1922 and dissolved on 24 May 1938, predecessor of the Centre national de la recherche scientifique (CNRS). In this role he founded the Salon des arts ménagers (Household Arts Exhibition), which showcased domestic appliances.

He died on 2 August 1940 in Meudon Bellevue.

References

1872 births
1940 deaths
People from Courrières
Politicians from Hauts-de-France
Republican-Socialist Party politicians
Government ministers of France
Members of the 7th Chamber of Deputies of the French Third Republic
Members of the 8th Chamber of Deputies of the French Third Republic
Members of the 9th Chamber of Deputies of the French Third Republic
Members of the 10th Chamber of Deputies of the French Third Republic
Members of the 11th Chamber of Deputies of the French Third Republic
Members of the 12th Chamber of Deputies of the French Third Republic
French Senators of the Third Republic
Senators of Cher (department)
Members of the French Academy of Sciences